Richard Berengarten (born 4 June 1943) is an English poet. Having lived in Italy, Greece, the US and the former Yugoslavia, his perspectives as a poet combine English, French, Mediterranean, Jewish, Slavic, American and Oriental influences. His poems explore historical and political material, inner worlds and their archetypal resonances, and relationships and everyday life. His work is marked by its multicultural frames of reference, depth of themes, and variety of forms. In the 1970s, he founded and ran the international Cambridge Poetry Festival. He has been an important presence in contemporary poetry for the past 40 years, and his work has been translated into more than 90 languages.

Life and work
Richard Berengarten (also known as Richard Burns and Li Dao, 李道) was born in London in 1943 of Jewish parents. He was educated at Normansal School (1949-51), Hereward House School (1952-54), Hendon County School (1954-56) and Mill Hill School. He studied English at Pembroke College, Cambridge (1961–64) and Linguistics at University College London (1977–78).

He has lived in Italy, Greece, the UK, the US and the former Yugoslavia, and worked extensively in the Czech Republic, Latvia, Macedonia, Poland, Russia and Slovakia. He has travelled widely throughout West Europe, the Balkans and the USA,  and in Japan, India and China.

Richard Berengarten published his first story (under the name of Richard Burns) at the age of 16 in Transatlantic Review. As a student, he wrote for Granta and co-founded the Oxbridge magazine Carcanet. He worked in Padua and Venice, briefly as apprentice to the English poet Peter Russell. In Greece, he witnessed the military coup d'état and in response wrote The Easter Rising 1967. Returning to Cambridge, he met Octavio Paz and, with Anthony Rudolf, co-edited An Octave for Octavio Paz (1972). In the same year, his first poetry collection, Double Flute won an Eric Gregory Award.

His posts include: the British Council, Athens (1967); East London College (1968–69); Cambridgeshire College of Arts and Technology (1969–79); Arts Council resident writer, Victoria Centre for Adult Education (1979–81); Visiting Professor, Notre Dame University (1982); and British Council Lector, Belgrade (1987–91). He is an authority on creative writing for children and adults, and on writing skills for university students. He was Royal Literary Fund Fellow at Newnham College, Cambridge (2003–2005), Project Fellow (2005–2006), and is currently a Preceptor at Corpus Christi College, a Bye-Fellow at Downing College and an Academic Associate at Pembroke College, Cambridge. He also teaches at Peterhouse and Wolfson College, Cambridge, a Fellow of the English Association, and poetry editor of the Jewish Quarterly.

Berengarten has translated poetry, fiction and criticism from Croatian, French, Greek, Italian, Macedonian and Serbian.

His poems and poetry books have been translated into over 85 languages (the poem Volta, presented in issue 9/2009 of The International Literary Quarterly (London) – Richard Burns, Volta: A Multilingual Anthology – into 75. Crna Svetlost (Black Light) was published in Yugoslavia in 1984, Arbol (Tree) in Spain in 1986, and bilingual editions of Tree/Baum (1989) and Black Light/Schwarzes Licht (1996), both translated by Theo Breuer, were published in Germany.

In 2004, Berengarten's first book of selected writings For the Living includes the award-winning poems 'The Rose of Sharon' (Keats Memorial Prize) and 'In Memory of George Seferis I' (Duncan Lawrie Prize).

Berengarten's 'Balkan Trilogy': The Blue Butterfly (2006), In A Time of Drought (2006); and Under Balkan Light (2008) has won international recognition, the first receiving the Wingate Prize, and the second receiving the Morava International Poetry Prize. The Blue Butterfly takes as its starting point, a Nazi massacre on 21 October 1941 in Kragujevac in the former Yugoslavia. Richard Berengarten visited the site and the memorial museum in 1985, when a blue butterfly landed on the forefinger of his writing hand. The resulting work is powerful, examining themes of revenge and forgiveness from the historical context to the present time. He was made an honorary citizen of Kragujevac in 2012, and the title poem is well known in the former Yugoslavia through the translation by Danilo Kiš and Ivan V. Lalic.

Richard Berengarten's perspectives as a poet combine British, French, Mediterranean, Jewish, Slavic, American and Oriental influences. A dedicated internationalist, Richard Berengarten has suggested the term “imaginationalist” as the keys to a poetics for our time. His poetry has been said to create “cross-cultural dialogue “and to belong to “world literature.”

Works

Poetry
Some of the earlier poems are collected in larger volumes such as For the Living.
 1967: The Easter Rising
 1971: The Return of Lazarus
 1972: Avebury
 1972: Double Flute
 1976: Inhabitable Space
 1977: Angels
 1977: Some Poems
 1980: Learning to Talk
 1980: Tree
 1982: Roots/Routes
 1983: Black Light
 1998: Half of Nowhere
 1999: Croft Woods
 1999: Against Perfection, King of Hearts Publications
 2001: The Manager, Shearsman Books 
 2003: Book With No Back Cover, David Paul Press
 2004: For the Living, (a collection of poems written between 1965 and 2000) Salt Publishing, reprinted by Shearsman Books
 2006: The Blue Butterfly (Balkan Trilogy I)  Shearsman Books
 2006: In a Time of Drought (Balkan Trilogy II), Shearsman Books
 2008: Under Balkan Light (Balkan Trilogy III), Shearsman Books
 2012: Like Dew Upon the Morning, six poems, Spokes Magazine 9 
 2014: Poems From 'Changing''', Fortnightly Review 
 2014: Manual (selected writings VI, 2009, 2014), Shearsman Books
 2015: Changing, Shearsman Books
 2015: Notness: Metaphysical Sonnets, Shearsman Books
 2022: The Wine Cup: Twenty-four Villanelles for Tao Yuanming, Shearsman Books
 2022: Dyad (with Will Hill), knives forks and spoons press

Anthologies 
Anthology collections containing works by Richard Berengarten
 2009: Neil Wenborn & MEJ Hughes – Contourlines: New Responses to Landscape in Words and Image

Prose
 1981: Ceri Richards and Dylan Thomas – Keys To Transformation
 1985: Anthony Rudolf & The Menard Press
 1989: Anthony Dorrell: Am Memoir
 1996: With Peter Russell in Venice
 2009: Border/Lines: an Introduction 
 2010: The dialectics of oxygen: Twelve Propositions 
 2011: A Nimble Footing on the Coals: Tin Ujevic, Lyricist:Some English Perspectives
 2015: Octavio Paz in Cambridge, 1970 
 2015: On Poetry and Sound: The Ontogenesis of Poetry 
 2015: On Writing and Inner Speech

Editor
 1972: An Octave for Octavio Paz 
 1980: Ceri Richards: Drawings to Poems by Dylan Thomas 
 1980: Rivers of Life 
 1983: Roberto Sanesi, In Visible Ink: Selected Poems 
 1981: Homage to Mandelstam 
 1983: Roberto Sanesi, In Visible Ink: Selected Poems 
 2008: For Angus – Poems, Prose, Sketches and Music with Gideon Calder
 2009: Volta: A Multilingual Anthology 
 2010: Nasos Vayenas – The Perfect Order: Selected Poems 1974–2010 . Edited by Paschalis Nikolaou, Richard Berengarten

Translations
 Aldo Vianello, Time of a Flower
 A. Samarakis, The Flaw (tr. with Peter Mansfield)
 Roberto Sanesi, The Graphic Works of Ceri Richards
 Roberto Sanesi, On the Art of Henry Moore
 Nasos Vayenas, biography
 Tin Ujević – Twelve Poems (2013)
 Paschalis Nikalaou – 12 Greek Poems After Cavafy (2015)
 Edited by George Szirtes – New Order: Hungarian Poets of the Post 1989 Generation

Works about Richard Berengarten 
 Simon Jenner on Richard Berengarten (2013)
 Norman Jope, Paul Scott Derrick & Catherine E. Byfield: The Companion to Richard Berengarten (2016)

Awards
 Eric Gregory Award (1972)
 Keats Memorial Prize for Poetry (1972)
 Art Council Writer' Award (1973)
 Keats Memorial Poetry Prize (1974)
 Duncan Lawrie Prize, Arvon International Poetry Competition (1982)
 Yeats Club Prize for poem and translation (1989)
 Yeats Club Prize for translation (1990)
 International Morava Poetry Prize (2005)
 Jewish Quarterly-Wingate Literary Prize for Poetry (1992)
 International Morava Poetry Prize (2005)
 Veliki školski čas award (Serbia) (2007)
 Manada Prize (Macedonia) (2011)

Notes

References

External links
 
 Richard Burns at Salt Publishing
 The International Literary Quarterly: Bio of Richard Berengarten
 Interviewed by Alan Macfarlane 16 March 2015 (video)
 Ричард Беренгартен (Бернс) (Великобритания)

Jewish poets
British poets
Living people
1943 births
English Jews
People educated at Mill Hill School
Alumni of Pembroke College, Cambridge
English male poets
Fellows of the English Association